Colby-Jack, or Co-jack/Cojack, is an American cheese made from Colby and Monterey Jack. It is classified as semi-hard in texture and is mild due to its two-week aging process. It is generally sold in a full-moon or a half-moon shape when it is young.  The flavor of Colby-Jack is mild to mellow. Colby-Jack cheese is mainly produced in the states of Wisconsin and California. It is used in various dishes or as a topping to be melted. These dishes include burgers, pasta bakes, macaroni and cheese, casseroles and so on. It is predominantly used in the United States, and is not readily available internationally.

Origin
The name Colby-Jack comes from the combination of the names of the two kinds of cheese it is made from, Colby and Monterey Jack cheese. Colby cheese originates in Colby, Wisconsin, and was created by Joseph F. Steinwand in 1885. Monterey Jack cheese originates from Monterey, California, and was made by Mexican Franciscan Friars during the 1700s. Colby-Jack cheese was then processed by marbling the two kinds of cheese together. This process was first introduced in the same place Colby Cheese was made on its own. It was not made at a large scale until the 20th century when the cheese became more popular and moved out of Wisconsin to larger areas of America (See Factory manufacturing). Before it was made on a large scale, the small, wooden building in Wisconsin only made  of cheese each day.

Ingredients and preparation

Ingredients
Colby-Jack is a marble cheese that is a mixture of Colby and Monterey Jack cheeses. Colby-Jack is a semi-soft American cheese that is made from pasteurised milk. Furthermore, the cheese contains cheese culture, salt, enzymes and annatto. Annatto is what gives the Colby component of Colby-Jack its orange color. Together the Colby-Jack becomes distinctly marbled with white and orange. The flavor of the individual cheeses used in the blend will determine how strong the final Colby-Jack will taste.

List of ingredients
Cheese curds
Cheese/bacteria cultures
Salt
Pasteurised milk
Annatto
Enzymes
Coagulant

Sodium content
The National Salt Reduction Initiative was proposed in 2009 to reduce the ratio of sodium in cheese to 1 g to 100 g. The baseline amount of sodium in 2009 of Colby-Jack was 668 mg of sodium to 100 g of cheese. By 2014 Colby-Jack was down to 600 mg to 100 g of cheese

Preparation
Colby-Jack is prepared from a blend of Colby and Monterey Jack cheeses. To begin, both cheeses are individually prepared by mixing pasteurized milk and bacterial cultures. Once fully mixed, a coagulant is added, which makes the cheese mixture thicken and take on a gel-like consistency; the addition of coagulant also serves to separate the cheese curds and whey. Annatto is then added, though only to the Colby mixture. Once ingredients have been mixed, the mixtures are drained of their whey, and high-quality curds of each cheese are selected from the remaining solid product. Chosen curds of both cheeses are then blended together, creating the marbling effect of orange and white. The blended mixture is then shaped (frequently into a semicircular or rectangular block) or shredded. In some instances, the cheese may be dipped in wax for further preservation; this is subject to manufacturer preference.

Aging process
Most semi-soft cheese such as Colby-Jack whilst aging should be stored at 40°F to 45°F, wrapped in parchment or wax paper then again in plastic wrap. The aging process may last up to 14 days kept in a monitored environment to age. The aging process allows the cheese to fully set as well as completely combine in components and flavor.

Variations 

 Muscoda Mayhem Colby Jack – hot peppers add heat to this cheese from Muscoda, Wisconsin, and the Kase Meister Creamery.

Factory manufacturing

Manufacturing
The manufacturing of Colby-Jack can be split into two types of manufacturing, wholesale and industrial purposes. The preparation for Colby-Jack remains the same but is made at a larger scale. Due to the large volumes of cheese that is made in the factories, robots are used to make the process easier for large quantities. In particular, large cheese manufacturer Wirtz states, "To support this market need for customised product, we have to push our automation as far as we can, and make it do things that it was not designed to do". This automation is important as it makes the process easier with the many variations of Colby-Jack that companies need to produce. Once this process is completed, robots are again used to package the cheese and ready for packing and distribution.

Packing and distribution
The Colby-Jack is packaged and distributed through the utilisation of robotics. These robots pick the cheese from a conveyor belt and pack them into cases ready to be distributed. These robots are flexible and are able to carry 0.5 to 20 pounds of packaged cheese. This enables the production sequence to be more efficient and pack more into the packages ready for distribution. Before being distributed a randomly selected pack of Colby-Jack is chosen for quality control. Once this has been done the cheese is ready to be shipped across the US and overseas depending on the manufacturer.

Packaging
As Colby-Jack is made in different forms, packaging varies for each form of the cheese. The types of packaging that Colby-Jack might be packaged in include:
Vacuum packing
Paraffin wax
Latex emulsion (plastic coating)
There are many factors that should be considered when selecting the type of packaging. According to the journal Cheese Problems Solved, these factors include "permeability to water vapor, oxygen, NH3, CO2, and light, potential for migration of compounds from food to packaging or vice versa, and practical considerations, including suitability for labelling and compatibility with conditions during distribution and sale". This packaging will also depend on the manufacturer and is up to their discretion to decide what is best for their product.

Popularity
Colby-Jack cheese is popular around America  as it is traditionally an American cheese. It is also popular in various American and Mexican dishes. In these dishes it is mostly used to melt and a topping on various recipes. Although being most popular in America, Colby-Jack can also be found overseas due to being exported out of America. It is also popular as an "on-the-go" snack. According to the article by Kathie Canning, Americans mostly enjoy Colby-Jack as their own convenience and when they most feel like a snack. This is especially prominent in small cubed shaped pieces of Colby-Jack which are usually paired with potato chips or another easily portable snack. This will also determine the type of packaging the cheese is made into depending on the most convenient form for the consumer.

Recipes
There are many recipes that Colby-Jack is used in home recipes. It is mostly used to melt and top certain dishes. These dishes include:
Cheeseburger
Casserole
Tacos
Pizzas
Macaroni and cheese
Sandwiches
Nachos 
Salads
Quesadillas

These dishes do not exclusively use Colby-Jack but is used most often as it is "moist, softer and melts smoothly". It can be noted that dishes which make use of Colby-Jack cheese are typically traditional American and Mexican dishes. The reason most dishes use Colby-Jack is because it is a milder cheese that does not take away from the flavor of the dish itself.

Decrease in popularity
According to The Huffington Post, there has been a decreased popularity in American cheeses, in particular Cheddar, Colby, Monterey Jack and Colby Jack cheese. The article states "Italian cheeses have taken over the No. 1 spot as the most produced cheese in the U.S. The federal Department of Agriculture reported that more than 5.3 billion pounds of Italian cheeses were produced in the U.S. in 2017, compared with a little under 5.1 billion pounds of American-style cheeses. And it's all because of pizza."

Accolades
In 2008, Gregg Palubicki from Alto Dairy Cooperative's Black Creek plant submitted a 40-pound block of Colby-Jack into the World Championship Cheese and Butter Contest in Madison, Wisconsin. The block of cheese won its class in the contest, earning a 97.75 out of 100. After winning the award, president of Alto Dairy at the time, Rich Scheuerman stated: "Alto Dairy is honored to have received such a prestigious title, American-style cheeses such as Alto's Colby-Jack are very popular among U.S. consumers, and Alto is proud to be recognized again for making the best Colby-Jack in the world."

Commercialisation and sales

Use in restaurants
Colby-Jack is commonly used in commercial settings such as fast-food restaurants and can be widely found in supermarkets. In particular, it is widely used in breakfast fast food. Colby-Jack is commonly used as it is the easiest and quick to melt in the fast production of fast food. For example, at fast-food restaurant Dunkin' Donuts, it is used in its 'Supreme Omelette' line. The American quick-service chain Culver's has also used Colby-Jack cheese in one of their most popular burgers, the 'Colby Jack Pub Burger'. The Culver franchise had the burger as a limited edition burger during 2014. As most foods that are associated with Colby Jack are comfort food, such as casseroles, many restaurants use Colby Jack as the main melting cheese used. This is seen at the restaurant chain Denny's, where they use Colby jack cheese on their skillets and casseroles. Similarly, a restaurant chain 'The Melt', has a range of comfort foods such as grilled cheese sandwiches and soups that rely on cheese as the main ingredient of some of the dishes. An example of this is the "Colby Jack on Whole Wheat", included on the restaurant's small menu. The popular fast-food chain Chick-fil-A also has Colby-Jack as one of the main cheeses available on their chicken sandwiches.

Sales
In terms of sales, Colby-Jack is highly consumed in the United States. According to the USDA Data, "Per capita consumption of American-style natural cheeses such as cheddar, Colby and Jack cheeses rose from 11.7 pounds in 1995 to more than 15 pounds in 2017", indicating popularity in cheeses such as Colby-Jack. According to tastewise, the average yearly consumption growth of Colby-Jack is 38.85% and its frequency of consumption being 1.35 times on average per year.

Recalls

Sargento Foods Inc.: February 2017
During February 2017, Sargento Foods Inc. recalled various products, such as Shredded Reduced Fat Colby-Jack were voluntarily recalled due to possible bacterial contamination, specifically Listeria monocytogenes that was introduced by the Indiana-based Deutsch Kase Haus. Sargento has since cut ties with the company.

Henning's Cheese: May 2017
During May 2017, Henning's Cheese recalled Colby-Jack due to a temporary malfunctioning pasteurizer. It was stated that around 1000 pounds of the product were distributed through the state of Kiel. The cheese itself being recalled were 1 to 2 pound blocks sold on or after April 10, 2017. The result of the malfunction was seen to have not affected consumers.

Meijer: November 2016 to February 2017
From the November 10, 2016, to February 9, 2017, the FDA (Food and Drug Administration) ordered a recall of the cheeses Colby and Colby-Jack made by the company Meijer. This recall only extended to its own Deli stores. This was due to the potential cross-contamination with Listeria monocytogenes at their Middlebury, Indiana manufacturing factory. At the time customers were asked to either dispose of the product or return it to customer service at any Meijer store for a full refund. It was stated by the FDA, "The recalled product will be in plastic deli packaging with printed labels that have the UPCs 215927xxxxxx or 215938xxxxxx – the last 6 digits will vary, and are determined by weight since the product was purchased at the deli counter."

References

American cheeses
Cow's-milk cheeses
Cuisine of Wisconsin